Ceri Warnock is a British-born New Zealand environmental lawyer and professor in the Faculty of Law at the University of Otago.

Academic career 
Warnock has an LLB from Cardiff University and an LLM from the University of Auckland. She graduated from the University of Oxford with a DPhil.

Before moving to New Zealand, Warnock practiced as a barrister in England and Wales.

Warnock moved to the University of Otago as a lecturer in 2006 and was appointed associate professor, effective 1 February 2016. She was promoted to full professor with effect from 1 February 2019.

Warnock was awarded the 2013 international Research Fellowship by the New Zealand Law Foundation.

Selected works

References

External links 

 
 

Living people
Year of birth missing (living people)
New Zealand women academics

Alumni of Cardiff University
University of Auckland alumni
Academic staff of the University of Otago
Alumni of the University of Oxford
English emigrants to New Zealand